is a UK labour law case, concerning the construction of terms in a contract of employment.

Facts
British Airways plc reduced the number of cabin crew on their planes, above those required by law but below the level stipulated in a collective agreement, subject to a ‘disruption agreement’ requiring crew fly with one less member during disruptions and getting compensation. Section 7.1, entitled, "Minimum Planned Crew Complements" said,

Miss Malone’s contract said the collective agreement was incorporated. Malone argued the section was apt for incorporation because it affected the crew’s working conditions.

The Judge, Sir Christopher Holland held that those provisions were not apt for incorporation, and that even if he had found they were, he would not have awarded an injunction to enforce it because the balance of inconvenience weighed heavily against. The crew appealed.

Judgment
Smith LJ, for the Court of Appeal held that the provisions were not aspirational, they were definite undertakings, but not an undertaking to individual employees. If it was individually enforceable, it would be ridiculous because then an individual could bring a flight to a halt by refusing to work under the contract terms. It was only binding in honour.

Ward LJ and Jackson LJ concurred.

Notes

References

United Kingdom labour case law
British Airways litigation
Court of Appeal (England and Wales) cases
2010 in British law
2010 in case law
United Kingdom employment contract case law